Dima Moussa (born 1978) is a Syrian lawyer, feminist and politician who was elected vice president of the National Coalition for Syrian Revolutionary and Opposition Forces in May 2018.

Early life and education
Moussa was born in Aleppo and her family is originally from Homs. She is a Christian. Moussa left Syria with her parents in the 1990s, when she was 15, mainly due to the practices of the regime of Hafez al-Assad. Members of her extended family lived in Homs until they fled to the United States in 2012 when government forces began shelling the Christian neighbourhoods of Al-Hamidiyah during the Syrian Civil War.

Moussa has a degree in electrical engineering from the University of Illinois at Urbana–Champaign and a Juris Doctor from DePaul University.

Career
Moussa is a lawyer and considered a "liberal feminist". She has worked with the Human Rights Law Institute of DePaul University, focusing on Arab women's rights. She began working with Syrian activists after the Syrian uprising in 2011 and became a member of the Syrian opposition later that year. In 2011, she was a spokesperson for the Revolutionary Council of Homs.

Moussa was a founding member of the Syrian National Council. In 2014, she was a spokesperson for the activist group Homs Quarter Union, speaking out about deaths in the city due to starvation during the siege and noting that humanitarian aid had not reached the city since December 2012.

Moussa joined the National Coalition for Syrian Revolutionary and Opposition Forces in October 2016, and is a founding member and member of the General Secretariat of the Syrian Women's Political Movement, established in October 2017. In May 2016, she was one of 34 signatories to a letter to US President Barack Obama, calling on the United States to enforce the cessation of hostilities and take action to protect civilians in Aleppo.

Moussa has worked with Conscience Convoy, in May 2018 speaking as part of a delegation to the Ukrainian parliament speaking against human rights abuses against women in Syria. On International Women's Day 2018, she issued an appeal to women across the world to participate in sit-ins to highlight the suffering of Syrian women under the Assad regime, noting the continued silence on the murder, detention, kidnapping and rape of women in Syria.

Moussa was elected vice president of the Syrian National Coalition alongside Abdel Basset Hamo and Bader Jamous in May 2018, under President Abdurrahman Mustafa.

In June 2018, she called for international intervention after Assad put Law No. 10 in place, which aims to prevent refugees from returning to their homes, saying that it shows the government is "not serious" about engaging in transition.

Personal life
Moussa speaks Arabic, English and Assyrian.

References

External links
 

Living people
1978 births
People from Homs
Syrian Christians
Syrian women lawyers
Syrian feminists
Grainger College of Engineering alumni
DePaul University College of Law alumni
Syrian National Council members
National Coalition of Syrian Revolutionary and Opposition Forces members
Women vice presidents
21st-century Syrian women politicians
21st-century Syrian politicians